Manor is an electoral ward in the Metropolitan Borough of Stockport. It elects three councillors to Stockport Metropolitan Borough Council using the first past the post electoral method, electing one councillor every year without election on the fourth.

This was formerly a stronghold seat for the Liberal Democrats but the incumbent councillor, Sue Derbyshire, was defeated in 2016 to Charlie Stewart, of the Labour Party. Since then, Labour councillors have been elected every year, and it has been a target seat for the Stockport Labour Group.

Together with Brinnington and Central, Davenport and Cale Green, Edgeley and Cheadle Heath, Heatons North, and Heatons South, the ward lies in the Stockport Parliamentary Constituency. Manor ward contains Aquinas College, as well as Banks Lane Infant and Junior Schools.

Councillors
Manor electoral ward is represented in Westminster by Ann Coffey MP for Stockport.

The ward is represented on Stockport Council by three councillors:

 Sue Glithero (Lab)
 Laura Clingan (Lab)
 Charlie Stewart (Lab)

 indicates seat up for re-election.
 indicates councillor defected.

Elections in the 2010s

May 2019
Patrick McAuley left the Lib Dems and became an Independent councillor in 2016. He did not stand for re-election in 2019.

 May 2018 

May 2016

May 2015Patrick McAuley left Labour and became a Lib Dem councillor in 2012.

May 2014

May 2012

May 2011

References

External links
Stockport Metropolitan Borough Council

Wards of the Metropolitan Borough of Stockport